Gary O'Donnell may refer to:

 Gary O'Donnell (Australian footballer) (born 1965), Australian rules footballer and coach
 Gary O'Donnell (British Army soldier) (1968–2008), British recipient of the George Medal and bar
 Gary O'Donnell (Gaelic footballer) (born 1988), Gaelic football player